Santo André (Saint Andrew) is a Brazilian municipality located in the Metropolitan Region of São Paulo. It is part of a group of municipalities known as the ABC Region. According to the most recent census, the population is estimated at 721,368 (2020 est.) in an area of 175.8 km². or about 43,441 Acres of landmass.

It is the 15th most developed Brazilian city, and the eighth most developed city in the State of São Paulo, according to the UN. The city is also known to be the fifth best city in the country to raise children on the grounds of public and private education and health care.

History

The settlement, which became a town in 1553, with the name of Santo André da Borda do Campo, experienced rapid growth beginning in the 1930s. It was originally named São Bernardo because the municipality district headquarters were in São Bernardo do Campo, now a city nearby. In 1938, the name was changed to Santo André, as the district government was transferred to Santo André. Industries include chemical engineering, textiles, oil, metal products, metallurgy and printed matter. It is an industrial city, but more than 60% of Santo André's total area are protected by environmental water laws.

In 1867, a railway named the São Paulo Railway or the Estrada de Ferro Santos-Jundiaí, made it easier to be reached.  In 1954, it became the seat of the Roman Catholic Diocese of Santo André.

In 2002 the city shot to national prominence with the assassination of serving mayor Celso Daniel, whose murder remains unsolved.

Districts
 Distrito Sede - Santo André
 Paranapiacaba
 Distrito de Utinga - Santo André
 Distrito de Capuava - Santo André

Demography

Source: Census 2010

Sports

Football
 Football Team - Esporte Clube Santo André, the football (soccer) team of the city. 
 City Stadium - Estádio Bruno José Daniel - Capacity: 15,157

Titles
 Brazilian National Cup Champion in 2004, beating Flamengo in final game at Maracana Stadium in front of more than 80,000 Flamengo fans. 
 Paulista 2nd Division Champions in 1967, 1975, 1981 and 2008.
 Copa Estado de São Paulo, 2003
 Copa São Paulo Under-20, 2002
 Pelé scored his first professional goal ever at Santos Futebol Clube in Santo André Stadium

Volleyball
 Men's Volleyball Team - Pirelli Volleyball Club
 Men's World Club Champion in 1984. Later, the team had his name changed to Shopping ABC
 Santo André due to a new sponsorship contract signed with Shopping ABC, one of the biggest malls in the city.

Basketball
 Men's Basketball Team - Pinheiros Santo André - Plays Paulista League of Basketball

Boxing
 Hosts national Olympic team at Pedro Dell'Antonia Gymnasium facilities.

Twin towns – sister cities

Santo André is twinned with:
 Ribeira Brava, São Nicolau Island, Cape Verde
 Takasaki, Gunma, Japan

Notable people

References

External links
 Santo André City Hall 

 
Populated places established in 1553
1553 establishments in the Portuguese Empire